Lucy Jane ("Jennie") Brimhall Knight (December 13, 1875 – ) was a leader in the Church of Jesus Christ of Latter-day Saints (LDS Church). She was also one of the first two single female missionaries of the LDS Church.

Biography
Jennie Brimhall was born in Spanish Fork, Utah Territory, to George H. Brimhall and Alsina Elizabeth Wilkins. Jennie was educated as a teacher at Brigham Young University (BYU) and taught school in San Juan County, Utah.

On April 1, 1898, Jennie was set apart as one of the first two single women in the LDS Church to be formally selected as full-time church missionaries. The other was her childhood friend Inez Knight. Jennie Brimhall and Inez Knight were missionary companions in England in 1898; Jennie returned to Utah in November 1898 due to poor health.

After she returned from her mission, Jennie Brimhall married J. William Knight in January 1899. (William Knight was the brother of Inez Knight, her friend and missionary companion.) Shortly thereafter, she accompanied her husband to Canada, where his father Jesse Knight had established the Mormon settlement of Raymond in present-day Alberta. While living in Raymond, Jennie Knight was the president of the Taylor Stake's Young Ladies Mutual Improvement Association from 1903 to 1906.

William Knight and Jennie Knight later returned to live in Utah. In 1921, Jennie Knight was selected as the first counselor to Clarissa S. Williams in the General Presidency of the Relief Society. Along with Louise Y. Robison, Knight was a counselor to Williams until 1928, when the presidency was released from their duties.

Knight was the mother of two sons. The Knight Mangum Building on the BYU campus in Provo, Utah, is named after Knight and her sister-in-law Jennie Knight Mangum. Jennie died on March 31, 1957 of heart disease. Knight is buried in the Provo City Cemetery.

Publications

Articles

References

Further reading
Andrew Jenson, Latter-day Saints Biographical Encyclopedia 4:190–91.
Inez Knight Allen, "Jennie Brimhall Knight", Relief Society Magazine, December 1928, p. 645.

External links

1875 births
1957 deaths
19th-century Mormon missionaries
American emigrants to Canada
American leaders of the Church of Jesus Christ of Latter-day Saints
American Mormon missionaries in England
Brigham Young University alumni
Counselors in the General Presidency of the Relief Society
Female Mormon missionaries
People from Raymond, Alberta
People from Spanish Fork, Utah
Young Women (organization) people
Knight family (Latter Day Saints)
Latter Day Saints from Utah